Sathanur was one of the seats in Karnataka Legislative Assembly in India. It was part of Kanakapura Lok Sabha seat. After 2008 delimitation of seats, both the assembly and parliament seats became defunct.

Members of Assembly 
 1967 : H. Puttadasa (IND) 
 1972 : H. Puttadasa, Indian National Congress
 1978 : K. L. Shivalinge Gowda, Janata Party
 1983 : K G Srinivasa Murthy, Janata Party
 1985 : H. D. Devegowda, Janata Party
 1989 : D. K. Shivakumar, Indian National Congress
 1994 : D. K. Shivakumar, Independent
 1999 : D. K. Shivakumar, Indian National Congress
 2004 : D. K. Shivakumar, Indian National Congress
2008 onwards : The seat does not exist.

Election Results

1967 Assembly Election
 H. Puttadasa (IND) : 13,199 votes   
 S. Honnaiah (INC) : 12,700

2004 Assembly Election
 D. K. Shivakumar (INC) : 51,603 votes  
 Vishwanath (JD-S) : 37675 votes

See also 
 List of constituencies of Karnataka Legislative Assembly

References 

Former assembly constituencies of Karnataka